Pyu Township  is a township in Taungoo District in the Bago Region of Myanmar. The principal town and administrative seat is Pyu.

Notes

Townships of the Bago Region
Taungoo District